Jaume Marquet i Cot, more popularly known as Jimmy Jump (born 14 March 1976), is a streaker from Sabadell, Catalonia, Spain, known for interfering in several major entertainment and sporting events.

Incidents

Football 

On 4 July 2004, during the UEFA Euro 2004 final between Greece and Portugal, Marquet threw an FC Barcelona flag at the Portuguese captain – Luís Figo – who left that team to join their archrivals, Real Madrid CF, in 2000.

In the semi-final of 2005-06 UEFA Champions League between Villarreal CF and Arsenal FC, he ran on the track just before the start of the second half. He threw onto the pitch an FC Barcelona shirt (with the name Henry and number 14) ahead of Arsenal player Thierry Henry. On 25 June 2007, Henry signed for Barcelona.

At the final of the 2006-07 UEFA Champions League in Athens, Greece, between AC Milan and Liverpool FC, Jimmy Jump ran down the field with a Greek flag, but this was not shown by the television cameras. In August of the same year, after Lionel Messi scored a goal against FC Bayern Munich, Marquet put a hat on Messi's head. 

Marquet also appeared in the UEFA Euro 2008 semi-final, between Germany and Turkey. This time he was carrying a flag of Tibet and a shirt with the inscription "Tibet is not China".

Jimmy Jump also ran onto the field during a game of La Liga between Barcelona and Racing de Santander.

On 11 July 2010, moments before the 2010 FIFA World Cup Final between Spain and the Netherlands, played in Johannesburg, South Africa, Marquet rushed onto the field and attempted to place a barretina on the World Cup trophy before being apprehended by several security guards. He was ordered to pay a ZAR2,000 fine for the incident.

On 11 September 2010, Marquet ran onto the field before the second half of the Hungarian Derby between Újpest FC and Ferencvárosi TC. He held a Catalan flag with the message "Kubala forever", in honour of former Barcelona and Ferencvárosi player László Kubala. Before the security guards caught him, he kicked the ball into the Ferencvárosi goal. Security handed him over to the police and he was taken into custody for four hours, before being released and fined approximately EUR350.

Formula 1 
In the 2004 Spanish Grand Prix, Jimmy ran through the starting grid during the formation lap, only to be apprehended by race marshals shortly after. While he claimed to have many fans (due to his other performances at football matches), he was criticized for risking the lives of the drivers, even though the cars were travelling at low speed at this point.

Tennis 
During the 2009 Men's Singles Finals of the French Open, he accosted eventual winner Roger Federer, attempting to place a red barretina on his head. Marquet was tackled by a security guard while stumbling after he jumped over the net. He faced up to 12 months in prison for the incident.

Eurovision Song Contest 
During the 2010 Eurovision Song Contest in Norway, Marquet invaded the stage during the Spanish performance by Daniel Diges and took part in the choreography. He subsequently left the stage at the venue and was immediately escorted away from the concert area and taken to Sandvika police station, where he was arrested and fined NOK15,000. Due to the incident, Svante Stockselius, the executive supervisor of the Eurovision Song Contest at that time, allowed Spain to perform for a second time after the last regular performance.

Goya Awards 
On 13 February 2011, during the 25th Goya Awards ceremony, Marquet invaded the stage just before the best actor award was handed over to Javier Bardem. Before being whisked away, Marquet could say only a few words on the microphone and cover the Best Actor Goya statuette with a barretina.

Elsewhere 
On 14 September 2010, after the 2010-11 UEFA Champions League match between FC Barcelona and Panathinaikos FC, Marquet appeared in a weather forecast on Hungarian television channel TV2. He waved, shouting "Barcelona, Barcelona!", placed his cap on the forecaster, and chanted "Barça!". Marquet had a microphone attached to this t-shirt because he was a guest in an earlier talk show.

See also
Mark Roberts – a UK serial streaker

References

External links 
 

1976 births
Living people
Association football supporters 
People from Catalonia
People from Sabadell
Sports spectators 
Streakers